Riley 'Kestrel' was a brand name applied by the Riley Motor Car Company and its successors the Nuffield Organization and the British Leyland Motor Corporation to various of their saloon car models.

Some of the cars produced in each of the following models received the Kestrel name (in the pre-war examples it typically denoted a sporty model with 'fastback' styling):
Riley Nine 1926–1937
Riley 12/4 1935–1935
Riley 1½ Litre 1935–1938 
Riley 16 (16/4) 2½-litre1937–1940
A variant of the BMC ADO16/ Austin/Morris 1100/1300) 1965–1969

References

Kestrel